Miss Earth Nigeria is an annual national beauty pageant in Nigeria to select its representative to the international Miss Earth pageant. The pageant, with the theme "Beauties for a Cause" is organized by AMC Productions, and began sending representatives to Miss Earth a year after the international pageant was established in 2001. Nigeria has achieved 5 placements in Miss Earth. 

The current titleholder is Esther Oluwatosin Ajayi.

History
Originally, titleholders were from rival pageants Miss Commonwealth Nigeria (Vanessa Ibene Ekeke) and Miss Nigeria (Ewemade Ogbebor), until Miss Earth Nigeria became a pageant in its own right in 2004. The winner is expected to work in collaboration with environmentalist and state parastatals on how to make water safe, check erosion, pollution among others. The pageant also conducts road shows to educate people on the three R's (Reduce, Reuse, Recycle).

Nigeria produced its first Miss Earth top ten finalist when Susan Modupe Garland entered in the top 10 in 2019.

The president and national director of the pageant is Ibinabo Fiberesima, a pageant veteran who is now a Nollywood actress.

Titleholders
Color key

Below are the Nigerian representatives to the Miss Earth pageant according to the year in which they participated. The special awards received and their final placements in the aforementioned global beauty competition are also displayed.

Other notable contestants
Chikaodili Nna-Udosen (2015) - TNQ 2020

Controversy
In 2009, Law student Nkesi Okandu was dethroned by pageant organisers after she refused to compete in Miss Globe International as opposed to Miss Earth. Fiberesima later claimed that she had received threatening phone calls from Okandu's family who argued that her substitution was unfair. The newly crowned queen was labelled "rude" by the organisers, and was forced to resign after just two weeks, allowing second-place winner Biochemistry student Modesta Alozie to compete at Miss Earth instead, and reign as Miss Earth Nigeria for the remaining eleven months. It has since been argued that this was a plan to eliminate the winner, noting that while Okandu had signed her contract on September 25 (the same day she was asked to compete in for Miss Globe International), Alozie was already being credited as the winner of Miss Earth Nigeria on the Miss Earth website as early as September 22.

Munachi Uzoma, who won the pageant in 2011, sued the organisers for breach of contract following their failure to give her the N1,000,000 cash prize and brand new car, and disclosed that some of her predecessors also suffered similar treatment.

References

External links
 
 

Nigeria
Beauty pageants in Nigeria
Nigerian awards
Recurring events established in 2002
2002 establishments in Nigeria